"Two plus two equals five" (2 + 2 = 5) is a mathematically incorrect phrase used in the 1949 dystopian novel Nineteen Eighty-Four by George Orwell. It appears as a possible statement of Ingsoc (English Socialism) philosophy, like the dogma "War is Peace", which the Party expects the citizens of Oceania to believe is true. In writing his secret diary in the year 1984, the protagonist Winston Smith ponders if the Inner Party might declare that "two plus two equals five" is a fact. Smith further ponders whether or not belief in such a consensus reality makes the lie true.

About the falsity of "two plus two equals five", in Room 101, the interrogator O'Brien tells the thought criminal Smith that control over physical reality is unimportant to the Party, provided the citizens of Oceania subordinate their real-world perceptions to the political will of the Party; and that, by way of doublethink: "Sometimes, Winston. [Sometimes it is four fingers.] Sometimes they are five. Sometimes they are three. Sometimes they are all of them at once".

As a theme and as a subject in the arts, the anti-intellectual slogan 2 + 2 = 5 pre-dates Orwell and has produced literature, such as Deux et deux font cinq (Two and Two Make Five), written in 1895 by Alphonse Allais, which is a collection of absurdist short stories; and the 1920 imagist art manifesto 2 × 2 = 5 by the poet Vadim Shershenevich, in the 20th century.

Self-evident truth and self-evident falsehood

In the 17th century, in the Meditations on First Philosophy, in which the Existence of God and the Immortality of the Soul are Demonstrated (1641), René Descartes said that the standard of truth is self-evidence of clear and distinct ideas. Despite the logician Descartes' understanding of "self-evident truth", the philosopher Descartes considered that the self-evident truth of "two plus two equals four" might not exist beyond the human mind; that there might not exist correspondence between abstract ideas and concrete reality.

In establishing the mundane reality of the self-evident truth of 2 + 2 = 4, in De Neutralibus et Mediis Libellus (1652) Johann Wigand said: "That twice two are four; a man may not lawfully make a doubt of it, because that manner of knowledge is grauen [graven] into mannes [man's] nature."

In the comedy-of-manners play Dom Juan, or The Feast with the Statue (1665), by Molière, the libertine protagonist, Dom Juan, is asked in what values he believes, and answers that he believes "two plus two equals four".

In the 18th century, the self-evident falsehood of 2 + 2 = 5 was attested in the Cyclopædia, or an Universal Dictionary of Arts and Sciences (1728), by Ephraim Chambers: "Thus, a Proposition would be absurd, that should affirm, that two and two make five; or that should deny 'em to make four." In 1779, Samuel Johnson likewise said that "You may have a reason why two and two should make five, but they will still make but four."

In the 19th century, in a personal letter to his future wife, Anabella Milbanke, Lord Byron said: "I know that two and two make four—& should be glad to prove it, too, if I could—though I must say if, by any sort of process, I could convert 2 & 2 into five, it would give me much greater pleasure."

In Gilbert and Sullivan's Princess Ida (1884), the Princess comments that "The narrow-minded pedant still believes/That two and two make four! Why, we can prove,/We women—household drudges as we are –/That two and two make five—or three—or seven;/Or five-and-twenty, if the case demands!"

Politics, literature, propaganda

France

In the late 18th century, in the pamphlet What is the Third Estate? (1789), about the legalistic denial of political rights to the common-folk majority of France, Emmanuel-Joseph Sieyès, said: "Consequently, if it be claimed that, under the French constitution, 200,000 individuals, out of 26 million citizens, constitute two-thirds of the common will, only one comment is possible: It is a claim that two and two make five."

Using the illogic of "two and two make five", Sieyès mocked the demagoguery of the Estates-General for assigning disproportionate voting power to the political minorities of France—the Clergy (First Estate) and the French nobility (Second Estate)—in relation to the Third Estate, the numeric and political majority of the citizens of France.

In the 19th century, in the novel Séraphîta (1834), about the nature of androgyny, Honoré de Balzac said:

In the pamphlet "Napoléon le Petit" (1852), about the limitations of the Second French Empire (1852–1870), such as majority political support for the monarchist coup d'Ḗtat, which installed Napoleon III (r. 1852–1870), and the French peoples' discarding from national politics the liberal values that informed the anti-monarchist Revolution, Victor Hugo said: "Now, get seven million, five hundred thousand votes to declare that two-and-two-make-five, that the straight line is the longest road, that the whole is less than its part; get it declared by eight millions, by ten millions, by a hundred millions of votes, you will not have advanced a step."

In The Plague (1947), French philosopher Albert Camus declared that times came in history when those who dared to say that 2 + 2 = 4 rather than 2 + 2 = 5 were put to death.

Russia

In the late 19th century, the Russian press used the phrase 2 + 2 = 5 to describe the moral confusion of social decline at the turn of a century, because political violence characterised much of the ideological conflict among proponents of humanist democracy and defenders of tsarist autocracy in Russia. In The Reaction in Germany (1842), Mikhail Bakunin said that the political compromises of the French Positivists, at the start of the July Revolution (1830), confirmed their middle-of-the-road mediocrity: "The Left says, 2 times 2 are 4; the Right, 2 times 2 are 6; and the Juste-milieu says, 2 times 2 are 5".

In Notes from Underground (1864), by Feodor Dostoevsky, the anonymous protagonist accepts the falsehood of "two plus two equals five", and considers the implications (ontological and epistemological) of rejecting the truth of "two times two makes four", and proposed that the intellectualism of free will—Man's inherent capability to choose or to reject logic and illogic—is the cognitive ability that makes humanity human: "I admit that twice two makes four is an excellent thing, but, if we are to give everything its due, twice two makes five is sometimes a very charming thing, too."

In the literary vignette "Prayer" (1881), Ivan Turgenev said that: "Whatever a man prays for, he prays for a miracle. Every prayer reduces itself to this: 'Great God, grant that twice two be not four'." In God and the State (1882), Bakunin dismissed deism: "Imagine a philosophical vinegar sauce of the most opposed systems, a mixture of Fathers of the Church, scholastic philosophers, Descartes and Pascal, Kant and Scottish psychologists, all this a superstructure on the divine and innate ideas of Plato, and covered up with a layer of Hegelian immanence, accompanied, of course, by an ignorance, as contemptuous as it is complete, of natural science, and proving, just as two times two make five, the existence of a personal god." Moreover, the slogan "two plus two equals five", is the title of the collection of absurdist short stories Deux et deux font cinq (Two and Two Make Five, 1895), by Alphonse Allais; and the title of the imagist art manifesto 2 x 2 = 5 (1920), by the poet Vadim Shershenevich.

In 1931, the artist  supported Stalin's shortened production schedule for the economy of the Soviet Union with a propaganda poster that announced the "Arithmetic of an Alternative Plan: 2 + 2 plus the Enthusiasm of the Workers = 5" after Stalin's announcement, in 1930, that the first five-year plan (1928–1933) instead would be completed in 1932, in four years' time.

George Orwell

George Orwell used the idea of 2 + 2 = 5 in an essay of January 1939 in The Adelphi; "Review of Power: A New Social Analysis by Bertrand Russell":

In propaganda work for the BBC (British Broadcasting Corporation) during the Second World War (1939–1945), Orwell applied the illogic of 2 + 2 = 5 to counter the reality-denying psychology of Nazi propaganda, which he addressed in the essay "Looking Back on the Spanish War" (1943), indicating that:

In addressing Nazi anti-intellectualism, Orwell's reference might have been Hermann Göring's hyperbolic praise of Adolf Hitler: "If the Führer wants it, two and two makes five!" In the political novel Nineteen Eighty-Four (1949), concerning the Party's philosophy of government for Oceania, Orwell said:

Contemporary usage

Politics and religion

In The Cult of the Amateur: How Today's Internet is Killing Our Culture (2007), the media critic Andrew Keen uses the slogan "two plus two equals five" to criticise the Wikipedia policy allowing any user to edit the encyclopedia — that the enthusiasm of the amateur for user generated content, peer production, and Web 2.0 technology leads to an encyclopedia of common knowledge, and not an encyclopedia of expert knowledge; that the "Wisdom of the crowd" will distort what society considers to be the truth.

In 2017, the Italian Catholic priest Antonio Spadaro tweeted: "Theology is not #Mathematics. 2 + 2 in #Theology can make 5. Because it has to do with #God and real #life of #people...." In defence of the priest, Traditionalist Catholics stated that Spadaro's remark was referring to alleged contradictions among interpretations of the apostolic exhortation Amoris laetitia (2016)—for divorced-remarried Catholics returning to the Church—and the doctrines of Marriage in the Catholic Church. That a person can freely act in contradiction to Catholic doctrine if he or she felt that God allowed that action—despite the moral and theological contradictions inherent to the action. That Spadaro's "two plus two equal five" comments refer to the Church philosophy that human reason is insufficient for the full comprehension of God.

Former mathematician Kareem Carr has said "if someone says 2+2=5, the correct response is, ‘What are your definitions and axioms?’ not a rant about the decline of Western civilization".

See also
One Plus One Equals Three
1=2

References

Further reading

External links
 "Two Plus Two Equals Red", Time Magazine, Monday, 30 Jun 1947

Fictional elements introduced in 1949
Nineteen Eighty-Four
Mind control
Communication of falsehoods
Addition
Quotations from literature
1940s neologisms
Science fiction catchphrases
Pseudomathematics